The Iwaki Formation is a palaeontological formation located in Iwaki, Fukushima, Japan. It dates to Eocene and early Oligocene periods. The formation contains three families of Artiodactyla–Anthracotheriidae, Entelodontidae, and Hypertragulidae.

Paleofauna
Anthracotheriidae indet.
Entelodontidae indet. 
Hypertragulidae indet.

See also
 List of fossil sites

Further reading
  (1993); Wildlife of Gondwana. Reed.

References

Geologic formations of Japan
Paleogene System of Asia
Paleogene Japan
Oligocene Series
Oligocene paleontological sites
Paleontology in Japan